John Fraser or John Frazer (c.1809–1849) was an Irish poet.

Fraser was born at Birr, King's County, about 1809. He was by occupation a cabinet-maker, but employed his leisure in literary studies. He wrote, under the pen name J. de Dean, a considerable quantity of sentimental and patriotic verse.

He died in Dublin in 1849.

References

1809 births
1849 deaths
Irish male poets
19th-century Irish poets
People from County Offaly
19th-century male writers